is a railway station on the Odakyu Odawara Line in Asao-ku, Kawasaki, Kanagawa Prefecture, Japan.

History
Kakio Station was opened on 1 April 1927. It was promoted to a Semi-Express stop in 1947, and a "Sakura Semi-Express" stop in 1948. It became a "Rush Hour Semi-Express" stop in 1960. The use of the trunk line was discontinued in 1977, and the station redesignated a "Section Semi Express" stop in 2004.

Station numbering was introduced in January 2014 with Kakio being assigned station number OH24.

Lines
Odakyu Electric Railway
Odawara Line

Layout
Kakio Station has two opposed side platforms serving two tracks.

Platforms

References 

Railway stations in Kanagawa Prefecture
Railway stations in Japan opened in 1927
Odakyu Odawara Line
Railway stations in Kawasaki, Kanagawa